Robert Q. Lewis (born Robert Goldberg; April 25, 1921 – December 11, 1991) was an American radio and television personality, comedian, game show host, and actor. Lewis added the middle initial "Q" to his name accidentally on the air in 1942, when he responded to a reference to radio comedian F. Chase Taylor's character, Colonel Lemuel Q. Stoopnagle, by saying, "and this is Robert Q. Lewis." He subsequently decided to retain the initial, telling interviewers that it stood for "Quizzical."

Lewis is perhaps best known for his game show participation, having been the first host of The Name's the Same, and regularly appearing on other Goodson-Todman panel shows. He also hosted and appeared on a multitude of television shows of the 1940s through the 1970s.

His most distinguishing feature was his horn-rimmed glasses, to the point that the title card for his second Robert Q. Lewis Show featured a pair of such glasses as a logo, and they were mentioned in the title of his lecture. As a frequent guest panelist on What's My Line?, Lewis's blindfold featured a sketched pair of glasses.

Biography

Early life
Lewis was born Robert Goldberg in Manhattan to Jewish immigrants from Imperial Russia. At age ten he set up a microphone and record player at home and became the family's disc jockey.

Radio
Lewis made his radio debut in 1931, at age ten, on a local radio show, "Dr. Posner's Kiddie Hour". He enrolled in the University of Michigan in 1938, where he was a member of the Phi Sigma Delta fraternity (later merged into Zeta Beta Tau).

In 1942 he left to enlist in the U.S. Army during the Second World War and became a radio operator in the Signal Corps.

After the war, he became an announcer and disc jockey.

Among those who served as writers on Lewis's radio programmes were playwright Neil Simon, author and dramatist Paddy Chayefsky, and radio comedy writer Goodman Ace. Simon, Chayefsky and Ace headed a CBS team of comedy writers that acted largely as "script doctors" for existing shows in need of fixing. Ace was frustrated over a CBS revamp of the show he assembled for Lewis, The Little Show: "I give them a good, tight, fifteen-minute comedy show", Ace told Time, "and what do they do? Expand it to half an hour and throw in an orchestra and an audience. Who the hell said a comedy show had to be half an hour, Marconi? Ida Cantor?"

In 1949, Lewis had a 30-minute sustaining program that was broadcast on CBS Monday - Friday at 4:30 p.m. Eastern Time. The Ames Brothers and Eugenie Baird were regular performers, and the Howard Smith Orchestra provided music. In addition to Lewis's comedy, the show also included audience participation as several people in the studio answered a question posed by Lewis. A review in the trade publication Variety called Lewis "a bright spot on the afternoon spectrum". 

Future talk-show host and producer Merv Griffin often sang on Lewis's network radio show. Besides his many guest appearances on variety programs and game shows in the early years of television, Lewis's favorite medium as host continued with radio, first for CBS and later as a disc jockey in Los Angeles. One of his radio series, Robert Q.'s Waxworks, was devoted to playing old records, setting a pattern that later radio personalities like Dr. Demento would follow. His interview-based program was heard locally on KFI, Los Angeles, in 1972.

Television

Lewis was an early arrival on network television, presiding over more than one series at a time. The Robert Q. Lewis Show had a six-month run on CBS's Sunday night television lineup from July 16, 1950, to January 7, 1951. At the same time he also hosted CBS's TV talent-search variety program The Show Goes On from January 19, 1950, to February 16, 1952. He also had two daytime variety shows on CBS. The first, Robert Q's Matinee, was a 45-minute daily show, which lasted 14 weeks, from October 16, 1950, to January 19, 1951. The second, more successful The Robert Q. Lewis Show ran on CBS-TV from January 11, 1954, to May 25, 1956.

Lewis was often recruited to fill in for performers who were ill or otherwise unable to perform. He frequently sat in for Arthur Godfrey, who was considered his tutor. Lewis often credited Godfrey with giving him his first big breaks in show business. Jackie Gleason invited "Robert Q. Lewis and His Gang" to take over his American Scene Magazine time slot while he was away. These emergency replacements became part of Lewis's comic monologue; he'd tell of how he phoned his mother to watch him on CBS, only to hear her say, "Oh? Who's sick?"

Robert Q. became a fixture on television quiz shows in the 1950s and 1960s. In 1952, he settled into his most enduring game show role as host of ABC's The Name's the Same. In 1954, Lewis gave up the show to devote more time to his variety program; several times during his tenure, contestants appeared on the show bearing the name Robert Q. Lewis. In 1958, he hosted the short-lived original version of Make Me Laugh. In 1962, he substituted for and ultimately replaced Merv Griffin as host of  Play Your Hunch. In 1964, he hosted the short-lived game show Get the Message on ABC.

He was a frequent participant on the panel show What's My Line?, making 40 appearances on the show. He first appeared as a panelist in 1951, about a year into the show's run. His most regular run on the show was alternating weeks with comedian Fred Allen following the departure of regular panelist Steve Allen, beginning in 1954 through early 1955; Fred Allen ultimately took the spot on the panel on a regular basis for approximately a year until his death. Lewis continued to make regular guest appearances on the panel right up to the show's final year in 1967. He also made one appearance as the show's "Mystery Guest" in 1955. He was also a guest panelist/player on a number of Goodson-Todman shows, including To Tell The Truth, Get The Message and both the original and 1970s versions of Match Game.

Records

Lewis was always an enthusiast of vintage music. He frequently revived old Tin Pan Alley tunes on his radio and TV shows, and in his very popular nightclub act. From the 1940s he sang for Columbia Records, MGM Records, and Coral Records. He scored his biggest hit in 1951 with the dialect novelty song, "Where's-a Your House?", an answer record to the Rosemary Clooney hit "Come On-a My House". In 1967, he recorded I'm Just Wild About Vaudeville for Atco—this collection of circa-1930 songs has Lewis cleverly imitating different singing styles of the day.

Movies, TV, and theater

Lewis's fondness for show-business nostalgia was well known within the industry, and in 1949 he was hired to narrate the "lighter side" segment of the feature-length March of Time documentary film The Golden Twenties. He was too busy to pursue a movie career at the time because of his hectic radio, television, and nightclub schedule.

Later in his career, Lewis acted in a few movies, notably An Affair to Remember (1957), Good Neighbor Sam (1964), Ski Party (1965), Everything You Always Wanted to Know About Sex* (*But Were Afraid to Ask) (1972), How to Succeed in Business Without Really Trying (1967), and the TV movie The Law (1974), in which he played a dinner speaker at a lawyers' convention. He also appeared on a number of television series, including Room for One More; The Hathaways; Branded; The Patty Duke Show; Ichabod and Me; Bewitched;  Love, American Style; and Emergency!, among others.

During the 1960s, Lewis became a familiar face on the live-theater circuit, starring in road-company versions of Broadway hits, including Bells Are Ringing, Cabaret, and The Odd Couple. He continued to make sporadic acting appearances until a few years before his death.

Personal life
Lewis was a long-time smoker, and was frequently seen smoking cigarettes on the air in the early days of television. At that time smoking was not uncommon on panel shows and was even encouraged, especially because a number of those programs were sponsored by cigarette brands. He died in 1991 at age 70 of emphysema in Los Angeles, California. 

A collection of Robert Q. Lewis's personal papers, notes, and scripts, covering roughly the years 1940 until 1960, is located at Thousand Oaks Library in Thousand Oaks, California.

Filmography

References

External links
 
 
 Kinescope of "The Robert Q. Lewis Show" at the Internet Archive

1921 births
1991 deaths
United States Army personnel of World War II
American male film actors
American male television actors
American people of Russian-Jewish descent
Deaths from emphysema
American game show hosts
Jewish American male actors
Radio personalities from New York City
20th-century American male actors
University of Michigan alumni
United States Army soldiers
20th-century American Jews